Providence Township is a township in south central Lancaster County, Pennsylvania, United States. The population was 7,025 at the 2020 census. It is part of the Solanco School District.

Geography
The township includes the unincorporated communities of Smithville, New Providence, Union, and Truce.

Demographics

At the 2000 census there were 6,651 people, 2,387 households, and 1,847 families living in the township.  The population density was 330.3 people per square mile (127.5/km).  There were 2,486 housing units at an average density of 123.4/sq mi (47.7/km).  The racial makeup of the township was 97.74% White, 0.62% African American, 0.17% Native American, 0.21% Asian, 0.02% Pacific Islander, 0.35% from other races, and 0.90% from two or more races. Hispanic or Latino of any race were 0.92%.

There were 2,387 households, 36.8% had children under the age of 18 living with them, 66.1% were married couples living together, 7.5% had a female householder with no husband present, and 22.6% were non-families. 18.7% of households were made up of individuals, and 7.1% were one person aged 65 or older.  The average household size was 2.78 and the average family size was 3.19.

The age distribution was 27.8% under the age of 18, 8.2% from 18 to 24, 28.9% from 25 to 44, 24.0% from 45 to 64, and 11.1% 65 or older.  The median age was 37 years. For every 100 females, there were 98.8 males.  For every 100 females age 18 and over, there were 96.8 males.

The median household income was $45,018 and the median family income  was $49,738. Males had a median income of $37,207 versus $24,571 for females. The per capita income for the township was $17,912.  About 5.2% of families and 6.0% of the population were below the poverty line, including 9.0% of those under age 18 and 9.1% of those age 65 or over.

References

External links

Populated places established in 1720
Townships in Lancaster County, Pennsylvania
Townships in Pennsylvania
1720 establishments in Pennsylvania